Dr. Anna Sue Parrill (born 1935) is a scholar of 19th-century English literature. She has published articles and books on film and television productions set in the Tudor and Napoleonic periods, as well as on adaptations of Jane Austen's novels.

Career
In 2002 McFarland published Jane Austen on Film and Television, a work described in 2005 as "the most comprehensive critical survey of all the film and television adaptations of Austen's novels". It has been quoted in media articles as well as by Austen and film scholars such as Deborah Cartmell. In 2003, she attended the Eighteenth Century Women Writers Conference in Winchester, England where she presented her paper "The Americanization of Jane: Three Early Television Adaptations". Parrill has also contributed articles to Persuasions, a journal by the Jane Austen Society of North America, in addition to serving as that organization's book review editor.

In December 2012 McFarland published The Tudors on Film and Television, a book she co-authored with William B. Robison, one of her colleagues in Southeastern Louisiana University's History and Political Science Department. Robison described the work as a "comprehensive filmography and a historical analysis of Tudor films". In the year leading up to the book's release, the pair created a website and Facebook page with the intent of facilitating discussion and supplementing the content seen in their book.

Selected bibliography
Articles
 
 
 
 

Books
 
 
  (with William B. Robison)

References

External links
 Parrill's faculty website

1935 births
Southeastern Louisiana University faculty
American academics of English literature
Living people
American women non-fiction writers
American women academics
21st-century American women